Roncador can refer to:

 Brazil
 Roncador, Paraná, municipality in Paraná, Brazil
 Roncador Ecological Reserve, protected area near Brasilia
 Roncador Oil Field, oil field off Brazilian coast, site of Petrobras 36 Oil Platform
 Pico do Roncador, highest mountain of the Federal District

 Colombia
 Roncador Bank, Colombia
 Roncador Cay, Colombia

 Solomon Islands
 Roncador Reef, Solomon Islands

 Other
 Spotfin croaker (Roncador stearnsii), Pacific fish
 USS Roncador (SS-301), World War II submarine